Lavinia Santucci (born 4 June 1985) is an Italian female basketball player.

References

External links
 Eurobasket.com: profile
 FIBA.com: profile
 Lega Basket Femminile (LBF): Lavinia Santucci
 FIP: Lavinia Santucci

1985 births
Living people
Basketball players from Rome
Italian women's basketball players
Power forwards (basketball)